Miles Edgar Agar (June 13, 1858 – May 25, 1944) was a Canadian politician. He served in the Legislative Assembly of New Brunswick as member of the Conservative party representing Saint John City from 1925 to 1935.

References

1858 births
1944 deaths
20th-century Canadian legislators
Politicians from Saint John, New Brunswick
Progressive Conservative Party of New Brunswick MLAs